English actress Kate Winslet made her screen debut at age fifteen in the BBC series Dark Season (1991). Following more television appearances in the UK, she made her film debut with the leading role of murderess Juliet Hulme in Peter Jackson's crime film Heavenly Creatures (1994). Winslet gained wider recognition for playing Marianne Dashwood in a 1995 film adaptation of Sense and Sensibility, for which she received an Academy Award nomination and won the BAFTA Award for Best Supporting Actress. The same year, she appeared in the Royal Exchange Theatre's production of Joe Orton's farce What the Butler Saw. In 1997, she starred opposite Leonardo DiCaprio in James Cameron's romance Titanic, which emerged as the highest-grossing film of all time to that point; it established her as a star and earned her an Academy Award for Best Actress nomination.

Winslet followed Titanic with roles in small-scale period dramas which were critically acclaimed but not widely seen. She played a disillusioned single mother in Hideous Kinky (1998), an Australian woman brainwashed by a religious cult in Holy Smoke! (1999), a sexually repressed laundress in Quills (2000), and the novelist Iris Murdoch in Iris (2001). For the last of these, she received her third Academy Award nomination. Winslet was awarded a Grammy Award for narrating a short story in the children's audiobook Listen to the Storyteller (1999), and she sang the single "What If" for the 2001 animated film Christmas Carol: The Movie. The 2004 science fiction romance Eternal Sunshine of the Spotless Mind marked one of her first roles set in contemporary times, and Winslet followed it by playing Sylvia Llewelyn Davies in Finding Neverland (2004) and an unhappy housewife in Little Children (2006). She received Academy Award nominations for the first and last of these, and went on to star alongside Cameron Diaz in the commercially successful romantic comedy The Holiday (2006).

In 2008, Winslet played a 1950s housewife yearning for a better life in Revolutionary Road and a Nazi concentration camp guard in The Reader. For the latter, she was awarded the BAFTA and Academy Award for Best Actress. Winslet next played the eponymous protagonist in the HBO miniseries Mildred Pierce (2011), for which she won the Primetime Emmy Award for Outstanding Lead Actress. In 2014, Winslet portrayed Jeanine Matthews in the Divergent film series, and in 2015, she starred in The Dressmaker, which ranks among the highest-grossing Australian films. For playing Joanna Hoffman in Danny Boyle's Steve Jobs (2015), a biopic of the titular inventor, she received her third BAFTA Award and her seventh Academy Award nomination. After playing a cynical waitress in Woody Allen's drama Wonder Wheel (2017), Winslet starred as a troubled police detective in the HBO miniseries Mare of Easttown (2021), winning another Primetime Emmy Award. In 2022, she had a supporting role in Cameron's science fiction film Avatar: The Way of Water, which emerged as her second film to earn over $2 billion worldwide.

Film

Television

Theatre

Video games

Discography

Audiobook

Bibliography

See also
 List of awards and nominations received by Kate Winslet

Notes

References

External links
 

Actress filmographies
British filmographies